Llansadwrn is a small village in the community of Cwm Cadnant in south-east Anglesey, in north-west Wales. It lies between Menai Bridge, Pentraeth and Beaumaris. It is named after the church, founded in the 6th century by Saint Saturninus, who together with his wife, is commemorated by an early Christian monument.

St Sadwrn's Church is a Grade II*-listed building.

The village was the birthplace of Wyn Roberts, Baron Roberts of Conwy who was a notable Conservative front-bencher for many years.

Close to the village was the site of the excavations that revealed the existence of Bryn Eryr Iron Age farmstead.

Notable people
Andrew Crombie Ramsay (31 January 1814 – 9 December 1891) was a famous Scottish geologist. He died at Beaumaris in Anglesey and is buried at St Sadwrn's church, Llansadwrn where a glacial erratic boulder marks his grave.

References

Bibliography
V. E. Nash-Williams, The Early Christian Monuments of Wales, Cardiff, 1950 .

External links 
 photos of Llansadwrn and surrounding area on geograph
 A Vision of Britain Through Time: Llansadwrn
 Genuki: Llansadwrn

Villages in Anglesey
Cwm Cadnant